Sven Lidman is the name of:
Sven Lidman (clergyman) (1786–1845), clergyman, antiquarian and orientalist, dean of the cathedral of Linköping
Sven Lidman (writer) (1882–1960), writer, leading member of the Pentecostal movement in Sweden
Sven Lidman (lexicographer) (1921-2011), lexicographer